A percolation test (colloquially called a perc test) is a test to determine the water absorption rate of soil (that is, its capacity for percolation) in preparation for the building of a septic drain field (leach field) or infiltration basin. The results of a percolation test are required to properly design a septic system. In its broadest terms, percolation testing is simply observing how quickly a known volume of water dissipates into the subsoil of a drilled hole of known surface area.  While every jurisdiction will have its own laws regarding the exact calculations for the length of line, depth of pit, etc., the testing procedures are the same.

In general, sandy soil will absorb more water than soil with a high concentration of clay or where the water table is close to the surface.

Testing method 
A percolation test consists of digging one or more holes in the soil of the proposed leach field to a specified depth, presoaking the holes by maintaining a high water level in the holes, then running the test by filling the holes to a specific level and timing the drop of the water level as the water percolates into the surrounding soil. There are various empirical formulae for determining the required size of a leach field based on the size of facility, the percolation test results, and other parameters.

For leach line testing, a minimum of three test holes are drilled or dug by hand, most commonly six to eight inches in diameter.  Ideally, these should be drilled to different depths from three to six feet below the surface.  For better, more conclusive results, five drill holes are used in a pattern of one hole at each corner of the proposed leach field and one test hole in the center.  Testing of these holes will result in a value with units of minutes per inch.  This value is then correlated to a predetermined county health code to establish the exact size of the leach field.

Testing for horizontal pits typically requires five to eight test holes drilled in a straight line, or along a common contour, from three to ten feet below the surface.  Testing is identical to leach line testing, though the end result is a different type of septic system, established through a different calculation.

Vertical seepage pits are slightly different in testing methods due to their large size, but the basic testing method is essentially the same.  A hole, typically three to four feet in diameter is drilled to a depth of twenty or thirty feet (depending on the local groundwater table), and a fire hose is used to fill the pit as quickly as possible, and then, again, its dissipation rate is observed.  This rate is used to calculate the size and number of pits necessary for a viable septic system.

Finally, for leach line systems and horizontal seepage pits, a "deep hole" is drilled to find the water table or to approximately twelve feet (dry).  Exact depths will again depend on local health codes.  In the case of a vertical seepage pit, local groundwater data may be used, or if the drill hole reaches groundwater, the pit will be backfilled again according to county health code.

Alternatives 

Some jurisdictions question the accuracy of a percolation test to assess the treatment quality of soil and instead utilize soil texture analysis--along with long-term acceptance rates (LTAR)--in place of, or in addition to, a percolation test.

References                          

How to Run a Percolation Test

Sewerage
Soil physics